Árni Þór Hallgrímson (born 10 March 1968) is an Icelandic badminton player. He competed in two events at the 1992 Summer Olympics.

References

External links
 

1968 births
Living people
Icelandic male badminton players
Olympic badminton players of Iceland
Badminton players at the 1992 Summer Olympics
Place of birth missing (living people)